Delmar Harold Paddock was a Major League Baseball third baseman. He played part of the 1912 season in the majors with two different teams, the Chicago White Sox and the New York Highlanders.

After two years with Vancouver, he was converted to an infielder in  while playing for the Calgary Bronchos of the Western Canada League. He was purchased by the White Sox from the Dubuque Hustlers of the Illinois–Indiana–Iowa League after the 1911 season.

After the 1912 season, Paddock returned to the minor leagues with the Rochester Hustlers, who purchased him from New York. He retired after the 1921 season, which he spent with the Sioux City Packers of the Western League.

Sources

Major League Baseball third basemen
Chicago White Sox players
New York Highlanders players
Vancouver Beavers players
Calgary Bronchos players
Dubuque Hustlers players
Dubuque Dubs players
Rochester Hustlers players
St. Paul Apostles players
Buffalo Bisons (minor league) players
St. Paul Saints (AA) players
Chattanooga Lookouts players
Mitchell Kernels players
Sioux City Packers players
Baseball players from South Dakota
1887 births
1952 deaths
People from Brookings County, South Dakota